Møbelringen Cup 2009 was held in Norway, in the cities of Orkanger and Trondheim. The tournament started on 20 November and finished on 22 November 2009. Norway won the event by winning all their matches.

Results

20 November 2009, Orkanger

21 November 2009, Trondheim

22 November 2009, Trondheim

References

2009 in handball
2009
2009 in Norwegian sport